Kettle Creek is a stream in El Paso County, Colorado, in the United States.

Kettle Creek was so named from an incident when a kettle was lost near its banks.

See also
List of rivers of Colorado

References

Rivers of El Paso County, Colorado
Rivers of Colorado